Ollie Albert Boyd (December 2, 1910 – April 29, 1941) was an American Negro league pitcher in the 1930s.

A native of Kansas City, Kansas, Boyd played for the Kansas City Monarchs in 1933 and 1934. He died in Bakersfield, California in 1941 at age 30.

References

External links
Baseball statistics and player information from Baseball-Reference Black Baseball Stats and Seamheads

1910 births
1941 deaths
Kansas City Monarchs players
20th-century African-American sportspeople